The Arnolds are a Southern Gospel trio and concert promotion company based in Tulsa, Oklahoma.

Group composition
This Southern Gospel trio consists of husband and wife Frank and Vicki Arnold and Sheri LaFontaine, who joined in 1999.
Frank Arnold originally started performing at 16 with his family group, which included his parents, sisters Jeanie and Lahona, and little brother Kenny on drums. In the early eighties they added Steve Snodgrass on piano and Dennis Fast on Bass, along with other members who came and went. Their big success came with their album Pearly Gates, which featured six original songs written by Dennis Fast, and recorded with help from Lari Goss in Nashville, Tennessee. At age 21, Frank wanted to become a Southern Gospel concert promoter. Many sacrifices from the family and group members helped put Frank on his way to becoming one of the leading concert promoters in Southern Gospel music. He won the Best Concert Promoter of the Year award for five consecutive years, and annually booked more than 40 southern gospel concerts in 25 cities before retiring from concert promoting in 2012.

Musical success
The group found success with several singles on The Singing News Top 80 Chart, including "When Nothing But A Miracle Will Do", "God's Still Faithful", and "He Cradles You". Frank was a concert promoter in Oklahoma, Texas, Alabama, Arkansas, Louisiana and Tennessee and was host to over 20 Southern Gospel performers at the annual Seminole Sing in Seminole, OK, Songfest in Jackson, TN and Singfest in Tulsa, OK. The Arnolds trio performed in churches and concert halls across the United States, appeared on TBN and performed with the Gaither Homecoming concerts and videos.

Musicians from Tulsa, Oklahoma
Musical groups from Oklahoma
American gospel musical groups
Southern gospel performers